Cobble Villa, also known as Villa Clara, is a historic home located at Long Beach in Nassau County, New York. It was built about 1912, and is a -story, asymmetrical Mediterranean Revival style brick and stuccoed dwelling.  It consists of an "L"-shaped core, a two-story gambrel roofed addition, and a one-story porte cochere. The building has a varied, multi-gabled roofline covered in red terra cotta tile.  It was built as the nascent resort's first showpiece and a demonstration of its developer's vision.

It was listed on the National Register of Historic Places in 2015.

References

Houses on the National Register of Historic Places in New York (state)
Houses completed in 1912
Houses in Nassau County, New York
National Register of Historic Places in Nassau County, New York